Doumen Station is a metro station of Line 1 of the Fuzhou Metro. It is located on the intersection of Hualin Road and Xiangbin Road in Jin'an District, Fuzhou, Fujian, China. It started operation on Jan 6, 2017.

References 

Railway stations in China opened in 2017
Fuzhou Metro stations